Melf may refer to:

 Melf, also known as Prince Brightflame; a grey elven archmage.
 Metal electrode leadless face, a type of leadless cylindrical electronic surface mount device that is metallized at its ends.